The 1986–87 Boise State Broncos men's basketball team represented Boise State University during the 1986–87 NCAA Division I men's basketball season. The Broncos were led by fourth-year head coach Bobby Dye and played their home games on campus at the BSU Pavilion in Boise, Idaho.

In the National Invitation Tournament, the Broncos hosted Utah of the WAC, and won by a point. At Seattle in the second round, BSU fell to Washington of the Pac-10 by five points.

The Broncos were led on the floor by sophomore point guard Chris Childs and junior  forward Arnell Jones.

Postseason results

|-
!colspan=6 style=| Big Sky tournament

|-
!colspan=6 style=| National Invitation tournament

References

External links
Sports Reference – Boise State Broncos – 1986–87 basketball season

Boise State Broncos men's basketball seasons
Boise State
Boise State
Boise State